Ohio Issue 1 can refer to several ballot measures:
 2004 Ohio Issue 1, a successful ballot measure regarding same-sex marriage
 May 2018 Ohio Issue 1, a successful ballot measure regarding congressional redistricting
 November 2018 Ohio Issue 1, a failed ballot measure reclassifying drug offenses as misdemeanors
 2022 Ohio Issue 1, a successful ballot measure regarding cash bail procedures

Ohio ballot measures